Di(2-propylheptyl) phthalate (also known as bis(2-propylheptyl) benzene-1,2-dicarboxylate, di(propylheptyl) orthophthalate, or DPHP) is an organic compound with the formula C28H46O4. It is a phthalate and is the diester of phthalic acid and the 10-carbon branched-chain alcohol 2-propylheptanol. This colorless, viscous liquid is used for softening PVC plastics and is a general purpose PVC plasticizer. It possesses very good plasticizing properties and may be used as a direct replacement for DEHP and DINP in many applications.

References

Phthalate esters